Shen Yaying (born 17 January 1994) is a Chinese badminton player. She was the champion of the 2015 Brasil Open Grand Prix tournament in the women's singles event.

Achievements

Asia Junior Championships
Girls' singles

BWF Grand Prix 
The BWF Grand Prix has two levels, the Grand Prix and Grand Prix Gold. It is a series of badminton tournaments sanctioned by the Badminton World Federation (BWF) since 2007.

Women's singles

 BWF Grand Prix Gold tournament
 BWF Grand Prix tournament

References

External links 
 

1994 births
Living people
Chinese female badminton players
Badminton players from Fujian
Sportspeople from Zhangzhou